WOW Hits 2013 is a two-disc compilation album composed of some of the biggest hits on Christian radio in 2012. This disc features 33 songs (39 on the deluxe edition).  It has sold 282,000 copies as of May 2013.

The WOW Series, of which this release is a part, has sold 17 million copies as of September 27, 2011.

Track listing

Charts

Weekly charts

Year-end charts

References

External links
 

2012 compilation albums
2013